Saranamanthram is a Hindu Devotional Songs album in Malayalam. The songs dedicated to Lord Ayyappa, is composed and arranged by aspiring Music Director Kamalan. The album is crafted with a strong base of Carnatic Music, complemented by the flawless lyrics written by B. K. Harinarayanan. The album is released in Kerala state in India.

The prominent south Indian Singer Unni Menon is the lead singer in this record. Blessed voices of noted singers like Sriram (Palghat Sriram), Classmates fame Devanand, Viswanath and Idea Star Singer Sannidhanandan are also featured in this album.

Tracks
 1. Slokam               - Unni Menon
 2. Sivanandana Nin      - Unni Menon
 3. Namamanthrasudhasaram- Devanand
 4. Pambayil             - Viswanath
 5. Ayyane Ponnayyane    - Unni Menon
 6. Manjin Pularkalam    - Devananth
 7. Pettathulli Njan     - Sannidhanandan
 8. Malayil Punyamalayil - Devanand
 9. Parthasarathikku     - Sriram
 10. Neyyabhisheka Priyane- Viswanath
 11. Vallinayakanu        - Sriram
 12. Pettathulli (instrumental)

References

External links
 http://www.unnimenon.com/
 http://vdevanand.com/

2009 albums